The Laurence Olivier Award for Best New Opera Production is an annual award presented by the Society of London Theatre in recognition of achievements in commercial London theatre. The awards were established as the Society of West End Theatre Awards in 1976, and renamed in 1984 in honour of English actor and director Laurence Olivier.

This award was first presented in 1993, becoming only the second Olivier Award focused solely on opera, along with the award for Outstanding Achievement in Opera (introduced in 1977).

Winners and nominees

1990s

2000s

2010s

2020s

References

External links
 

Opera Production
Opera-related lists